This article presents the discography of American rock band Toto.

Albums

Studio albums

Live albums

Soundtrack albums

Compilation albums

Box sets

Singles
This section presents singles released in North American, European and Japanese markets.

Notes:

Music videos

Notes

References

External links
 Official Toto discography

Discography
Discographies of American artists
Rock music group discographies